Bucktail State Park Natural Area is a  Pennsylvania state park in Cameron and Clinton Counties in Pennsylvania in the United States. Bucktail State Park Natural Area park runs along Sinnemahoning Creek and the West Branch Susquehanna River and also passes through Renovo (in Clinton County). The park is named for the Civil War Pennsylvania Bucktails Regiment and is primarily dedicated to wildlife viewing, especially elk.

Course

The course of Bucktail State Park Natural Area is as follows: leaving the city of Lock Haven, Pennsylvania Route 120 and the West Branch Susquehanna River pass through the following municipalities in Clinton County heading west (in order): Allison, Woodward, Bald Eagle, Colebrook, Grugan, and Chapman townships, the boroughs of Renovo and South Renovo, and Noyes Township. Next Pennsylvania 120 leaves the West Branch Susquehanna River and follows Sinnemahoning Creek west through East Keating Township, then crosses into Cameron County. There Pennsylvania Route 120 and Sinnemahoning Creek pass west through Grove and Gibson Townships and enter the borough of Driftwood, where Route 120 follows the Driftwood Branch of Sinnemahoning Creek north through Gibson, Lumber, Portage, and Shippen townships, finally reaching the borough of Emporium and the western end of Bucktail State Park.

History
Pennsylvania Route 120 follows an old Native American Trail, the Sinnemahoning Path. This trail was used by Native Americans to cross the eastern continental divide (specifically the Allegheny Front) between the Susquehanna River (which drains into the Chesapeake Bay) and the Allegheny River (which forms the Ohio River with the Monongahela River at Pittsburgh and eventually drains into the Gulf of Mexico via the Mississippi River). American Pioneers also used the trail to make their way west and it was also known as the Bucktail Trail. As the technology of road building advanced, what was once a Native American Trail became the two lane highway known today as Pennsylvania Route 120.

Pennsylvania Route 120 was officially designated as Bucktail State Park in 1933 by an act of the Pennsylvania Legislature. The Act says:

The rest of the land in the valleys is owned by the Bureau of State Parks and the Bureau of Forestry as part of Elk State Forest and Sproul State Forest.

Wildlife watching
Bucktail State Park Natural Area is in the West Branch and Sinnemahoning Valleys. River valleys are ideal gathering points for wildlife as the valleys tend to be warmer and wetter than the surrounding mountains. Animals are drawn to the warm and wet valley. The river valley is a natural passageway for plants and animals. The valley is home to river birch and sycamore trees. Osprey, a wide variety of duck, white-tailed deer, bald eagles, otter, merganser, mink and black bear can all be seen living in the boundaries of Bucktail State Park Natural Area.
 
Elk can be seen in the early morning and late afternoon hours in the northern portions of the park. Special elk viewing playforms have been built in Sinnemahoning State Park and near the small village of Bennezette.

Nearby state parks

The following state parks are within  of Bucktail State Park Natural Area:

References

External links

  

State parks of Pennsylvania
Protected areas established in 1933
Parks in Cameron County, Pennsylvania
Parks in Clinton County, Pennsylvania
1933 establishments in Pennsylvania
Protected areas of Cameron County, Pennsylvania
Protected areas of Clinton County, Pennsylvania